The Leyenda de Plata (1999) was professional wrestling tournament produced by the Mexican wrestling promotion Consejo Mundial de Lucha Libre (CMLLl; Spanish "World Wrestling Council") that ran from November 26, 1999, over the course of two of CMLL's Friday night shows in Arena México with the finals on December 2, 1999. The annual Leyenda de Plata tournament is held in honor of lucha libre legend El Santo and is one of CMLL's most important annual tournaments.

The qualifying Cibernetico took place on November 26, 1999 and saw El Hijo del Santo outlast a field of 15 other wrestlers including Antifaz del Norte, Bestia Salvaje, BlacK warrior, Blue Panther, Emilio Charles Jr., El Felino, Fuerza Guerrera, Negro Casas, Olímpico, Rey Bucanero, Satánico, Tarzan Boy, Tony Rivera, Último Guerrero and Zumbido. El Hijo del Santo only eliminated one wrestler in the match, Último Guerrero to qualify for the final. Like in 1998 the 1999 Leyenda de Plata cibernetico winner went straight to the final, a rematch from the 1998 tournament, only this time El Hijo del Santo defeated Scorpio Jr. to win the tournament named after his father.

Production

Background
The Leyenda de Plata (Spanish for "the Silver Legend") is an annual lucha libre tournament scripted and promoted by the Mexican professional wrestling promotion Consejo Mundial de Lucha Libre (CMLL).  The first Leyenda de Plata was held in 1998 and was in honor of El Santo, nicknamed Enmáscarado de Plata (the Silver mask) from which the tournament got its name. The trophy given to the winner is a plaque with a metal replica of the mask that El Santo wore in both wrestling and lucha films.

The Leyenda de Plata was held annually until 2003, at which point El Santo's son, El Hijo del Santo left CMLL on bad terms. The tournament returned in 2004 and has been held on an almost annual basis since then. The original format of the tournament was the Torneo cibernetico elimination match to qualify for a semi-final. The winner of the semi-final would face the winner of the previous year's tournament in the final. Since 2005 CMLL has held two cibernetico matches and the winner of each then meet in the semi-final. In 2011, the tournament was modified to eliminate the final stage as the previous winner, Místico, did not work for CMLL at that point in time

Storylines
The events featured a total of number of professional wrestling matches with different wrestlers involved in pre-existing scripted feuds, plots and storylines. Wrestlers were portrayed as either heels (referred to as rudos in Mexico, those that portray the "bad guys") or faces (técnicos in Mexico, the "good guy" characters) as they followed a series of tension-building events, which culminated in a wrestling match or series of matches.

Tournament overview

Cibernetico

Results

November 26, 1999

December 3, 1999

References

1999 in professional wrestling
Leyenda de Plata
Events in Mexico City
December 1999 events in Mexico